The Best of Crosby & Nash is a compilation album by Crosby & Nash released in 1978. It features tracks from the artists' solo albums as well as by the duo, although does not contain their biggest hit as a pair, "Immigration Man." Their final album on ABC Records, it is out of print, superseded in 2002 by a survey of their work for ABC released on compact disc.

Track listing

Personnel
 David Crosby – vocals all tracks except "Wild Tales" and "Chicago"; electric guitar on "Love Work Out," "The Wall Song," and "Carry Me"; guitars on "Southbound Train" and "Laughing" piano on "Bittersweet"
 Graham Nash – vocals; piano on "Love Work Out," "The Wall Song," "Chicago," and "To the Last Whale..."; guitar on "Wild Tales,"  "Southbound Train," "Laughing," and "Chicago"; Hammond organ on "The Wall Song" and "Chicago"; harmonica on "Southbound Train"; tambourine on "Chicago"

Additional personnel
 Craig Doerge — electric piano on "Bittersweet" and "To the Last Whale..."; Hammond organ on "Love Work Out"; piano on "Carry Me"; keyboards on "Out of the Darkness"
 Carole King — Hammond organ on "Bittersweet"
 Jerry Garcia – pedal steel guitar on "Southbound Train" and "Laughing"; electric guitar on "The Wall Song"
 Danny Kortchmar — electric guitar on  "Love Work Out," "Out of the Darkness," and "Bittersweet"
 David Lindley — slide guitar on "Love Work Out," "Wild Tales," and "Out of the Darkness"
 James Taylor — guitar on "Carry Me" and "To the Last Whale..."; backing vocals on "To the Last Whale..."
 Tim Drummond — bass on "Love Work Out," "Wild Tales," and "Out of the Darkness"
 Leland Sklar — bass on "Carry Me," "Bittersweet," and "To the Last Whale..."
 Chris Ethridge – bass on "Southbound Train" and "Chicago"
 Phil Lesh – bass on "The Wall Song" and "Laughing"
 Russ Kunkel — drums on "Love Work Out,"  "Carry Me," "Out of the Darkness," "Bittersweet," and "To the Last Whale..."
 John Barbata – drums on "Wild Tales," "Southbound Train," and "Chicago"; tambourine on "Chicago"
 Bill Kreutzmann – drums on "The Wall Song" and "Laughing"
 Jackson Browne — backing vocals on "Love Work Out"
 Joni Mitchell — backing vocals on "Laughing"
 Venetta Fields, Sherlie Matthews, Clydie King, Dorothy Morrison, Rita Coolidge – backing vocals on "Chicago"
 Jimmie Haskell — string arrangements on "To the Last Whale..."
 Lee Holdridge — string arrangements on "Out of the Darkness"
 Sid Sharp — orchestra leader on "Wind on the Water" and "Out of the Darkness"

Charts

References

Albums produced by Stephen Barncard
1978 greatest hits albums
ABC Records compilation albums
Crosby & Nash compilation albums